Racić is a Serbo-Croatian surname.

It may refer to:
 Bojana Racić, former vocalist in the Serbian rock band Cactus Jack
 Ljubiša Racić, former guitarist in the Yugoslav rock band Bijelo Dugme
 Zoran Racić, Serbian retired footballer

See also
 Račić (surname)